Christine Irene Marshall (born August 11, 1986) is an American competition swimmer and Olympic medalist. She attended Texas A&M University, and competed for the Texas A&M Aggies swimming and diving team from 2005 to 2009.

Marshall represented the United States at the 2008 Summer Olympics in Beijing, China. She received a bronze medal by swimming for the third-place U.S. team in the preliminary heats of the women's 4×200-meter freestyle relay.  She and her preliminary heat teammates set a new American record in the event.

See also
 List of Olympic medalists in swimming (women)
 List of Texas A&M University people
 List of United States records in swimming

References

External links
 
 
 
 
 
 

1986 births
Living people
American female freestyle swimmers
Medalists at the 2008 Summer Olympics
Olympic bronze medalists for the United States in swimming
Swimmers at the 2008 Summer Olympics
Texas A&M Aggies women's swimmers